The Skunk River is a  tributary of the Mississippi River in the state of Iowa in the United States.

Geography
The Skunk River rises in two branches, the South Skunk ( long) and the North Skunk ( long).  The headwaters of the South Skunk are in Hamilton County in north central Iowa. It flows roughly due southward, to the west of Interstate 35, and passes through the city of Ames, before turning southeasterly. In Keokuk County, it is joined by the North Skunk, which has its headwaters in Marshall County. It then proceeds southeastward and flows into the Mississippi about five miles south of the city of Burlington.

Etymology
The Sauk and Meskwaki referred to the Skunk River as "Shecaqua". This name was probably mistranslated; one early settler wrote, "I was informed by Frank Labisner, United States interpreter for the Sac and Fox Indians, that the name of Skunk River was a wrong interpretation. The Indian name was Checaqua. Which, in their language is anything of a strong or obnoxious smell, such as onions. I think, that from the fact that the head waters of the stream abounded with wild onions, the interpretation should be 'Onion.'"

Habitat
Species of fish found in the Skunk River include smallmouth bass, gar, walleye, catfish, carp, bluegill, sheephead, bullhead, and largemouth bass, crappie, sunfish.

The "Skunk River Navy" was founded and led by Iowa State University biology professor 'Admiral' Jim Colbert and biology advisor 'Admiral' Jim Holtz.  The SRN operated from August 1998 to September 2017.  The SRN focused on monitoring the biological diversity of the South Skunk River, and some of its tributaries, near Ames, Iowa as well as removal of trash from these streams.  Participation in the SRN was primarily focused on students entering Iowa State in the biology major, though students in other majors, other ISU personnel, as well as other individuals participated.  During the years of operation of the SRN approximately 2,400 volunteers participated and over 80 tons of trash were removed from the South Skunk River and some of its tributaries. The SRN also found, and reported, diesel fuel and sewage leaks into the South Skunk River, and its tributary Ioway Creek, respectively.  These leaks were repaired by the City of Ames.  Beginning in 2018 local paddling groups may use the name "Skunk River Navy", but the SRN is no longer under the auspices of the ISU Biology Program.

See also
List of Iowa rivers
Skunk River Greenbelt

References

External links
Skunk River Navy Official Website

Rivers of Iowa
Tributaries of the Mississippi River
Rivers of Lee County, Iowa
Rivers of Des Moines County, Iowa
Rivers of Poweshiek County, Iowa
Rivers of Henry County, Iowa
Rivers of Jefferson County, Iowa
Rivers of Washington County, Iowa
Rivers of Keokuk County, Iowa
Rivers of Jasper County, Iowa
Rivers of Story County, Iowa